The Order of Things: An Archaeology of the Human Sciences (Les mots et les choses: Une archéologie des sciences humaines, 1966) by French philosopher Michel Foucault proposes that every historical period has underlying epistemic assumptions, ways of thinking, which determine what is truth and what is acceptable discourse about a subject, by delineating the origins of biology, economics, and linguistics. The introduction to the origins of the human sciences begins with detailed, forensic analyses and discussion of the complex networks of sightlines, hidden-ness, and representation that exist in the group painting  (The Ladies-in-waiting, 1656) by Diego Velázquez. Foucault's application of the analyses shows the structural parallels in the similar developments in perception that occurred in researchers’ ways of seeing the subject in the human sciences.

The concept of episteme 
In The Order of Things: An Archaeology of the Human Sciences Foucault said that a historical period is characterized by epistemes — ways of thinking about truth and about discourse — which are common to the fields of knowledge, and determine what ideas it is possible to conceptualize and what ideas it is acceptable to affirm as true. That the acceptable ideas change and develop in the course of time, manifested as paradigm shifts of intellectualism, for instance between the periods of Classical antiquity (7th c. BC– AD 5th c.) and Modernity (AD 1500), is support for the thesis that every historical period has underlying epistemic assumptions, ways of thinking that determined what is truth and what is acceptable.

 Concerning language: from general grammar to linguistics
 Concerning living organisms: from natural history to biology
 Concerning money: from the science of wealth to economics

Foucault analyzes three epistemes: 

 The episteme of the Renaissance, characterized by resemblance and similitude
 The episteme of the Classical era, characterized by representation and ordering, identity and difference, as categorization and taxonomy
 The episteme of the Modern era, the character of which is the subject of the book

In the Classical-era episteme, the concept of Man was not yet defined, but spoken of. Man was not subject to a distinct epistemological awareness.

Epistemic interpretation 
 
The Order of Things (1966) is about the “cognitive status of the modern human sciences” in the production of knowledge — the ways of seeing that researchers apply to a subject under examination. Foucault's introduction to the epistemic origins of the human sciences is a forensic analysis of the painting Las Meninas (The Ladies-in-waiting, 1656), by Diego Velázquez, as an objet d’art. For the detailed descriptions, Foucault uses language that is “neither prescribed by, nor filtered through the various texts of art-historical investigation.” Ignoring the 17th-century social context of the painting — the subject (a royal family); the artist's biography, technical acumen, artistic sources and stylistic influences; and the relationship with his patrons (King Philip IV of Spain and Queen Mariana of Austria) — Foucault analyzes the conscious, artistic artifice of Las Meninas as a work of art, to show the network of complex, visual relationships that exist among the painter, the subjects, and the spectator who is viewing the painting:

 
As a representational painting Las Meninas is a new episteme (way of thinking) that is at the midpoint between two “great discontinuities” in European intellectualism, the Classical and the modern: “Perhaps there exists, in this painting by Velázquez, the representation, as it were, of Classical representation, and the definition of the space it opens up to us . . . representation freed, finally, from the relation that was impeding it, can offer itself as representation, in its pure form.”
 

 
The Order of Things concludes with Foucault's explanation of why he did the forensic analysis:

Influence
The critique of epistemic practices presented in The Order of Things: An Archaeology of the Human Sciences expanded and deepened the research methodology of cultural history. Foucault's presentation and explanation of cultural shifts in awareness about ways of thinking, prompted the historian of science Theodore Porter to investigate and examine the contemporary bases for the production of knowledge, which yielded a critique of the scientific researcher's psychological projection of modern categories of knowledge upon past people and things that remain intrinsically unintelligible, despite contemporary historical knowledge of the past under examination. 

In France, The Order of Things established Foucault's intellectual pre-eminence among the national intelligentsia; in a review of which, the philosopher Jean-Paul Sartre said that Foucault was “the last barricade of the bourgeoisie.” Responding to Sartre, Foucault said, “poor bourgeoisie; if they needed me as a ‘barricade’, then they had already lost power!” In the book Structuralism (Le Structuralisme, 1968) Jean Piaget compared Foucault's episteme to the concept of paradigm shift, which the philosopher of science Thomas Kuhn presented in The Structure of Scientific Revolutions (1962).

See also
Le Monde 100 Books of the Century
The Archaeology of Knowledge

Notes

External links
English translation of the Preface

1966 non-fiction books
Books about discourse analysis
Éditions Gallimard books
French non-fiction books
Philosophy books
Postmodern novels
Works by Michel Foucault